The Grønkjølen Nature Reserve is located in Møre og Romsdal and Trøndelag counties in Norway. The reserve is located in the municipalities of Surnadal (in Møre og Romsdal) and Rindal and Heim (in Trøndelag).

The reserve was established in 1996 to protect a large intact marsh area in a mountainous region, according to the conservation regulations.

References

External links
 Mijlø-direktoratet: Grønkjølen. Map and description of the nature reserve.
 Miljøverndepartementet. 1996. Grønkjølen naturreservat, Surnadal og Rindal kommunar, Møre og Romsdal fylke. 1:5,000 map of the nature reserve.
 Forskrift om fredning av Grønkjølen naturreservat, Surnadal og Rindal kommunar, Møre og Romsdal. 1996.

Nature reserves in Norway
Protected areas of Møre og Romsdal
Protected areas of Trøndelag
Heim, Norway
Rindal
Surnadal
Protected areas established in 1996